Stettin is a steam icebreaker built by the shipyard Stettiner Oderwerke in 1933. She was ordered by the Chamber of Commerce of Stettin (until 1945 Germany, since 1945 Szczecin, Poland). The economy of the city of Stettin strongly depended on the free access of ships to and from the Baltic Sea. Therefore, icebreakers were used to keep the shipping channels free from ice during the winter.

Design
For the first time in Germany, the construction was characterized by a new bow design called Runeberg-bow. This new bow design broke the ice using a novel method. It was not broken by the weight of the ship but by a sharp cutting edge. Future development of icebreakers was influenced by this bow form.

Although diesel-engines were already in wide use by 1933, Stettin was equipped with a steam engine. Unlike diesel engines, steam engines can be reversed within a very short period of approximately 3 to 4 seconds. This was important during manoeuvres of the ship under icey conditions in order to liberate the ship if it were to get stuck. 

With the special hull design and an engine power with a maximum horsepower of 2200, measured at the cylinders, Stettin was able to break ice up to a thickness of half a meter, at a constant speed of one to two knots. Thicker ice could only be broken by boxing, a process in which the ship ran several attacks until the ice gave way.

Operational history
The icebreakers of Stettin were handled by the Braeunlich shipping company, which ran a seaside resort ferry service along the coast during the summer. Its other ships had similar engines, so a single technical staff could be employed year round. Stettin was run by a crew of 22 men. This system was in place until the end of World War II.

From 1933 to 1945, Stettin was used in German Navy (Kriegsmarine) service on the Oder River between Stettin and Swinemünde, as well as on the Baltic Sea. On the night of 8 April 1940, Stettin participated in the capture of Copenhagen by participating in a surprise landing of German troops in Copenhagen together with the railway ferry/minelayer . Stettin is one of two or three surviving vessels of the east Prussia evacuation fleet.

From 1945 on, she was used by the waterway and navigation authorities in Hamburg on the river Elbe.

Preservation
In 1981, Stettin was slated to be scrapped due to uneconomic costs. However, with the establishment of a development association, thousands of working hours, and support by generous sponsors, the ship was saved. Today, she is a technical culture monument. Her homeport is the museum port of Oevelgoenne in Hamburg, Germany. During summertime, Stettin cruises with invited guests on occasions like "Hamburg port birthday," "Hansesail Rostock," and "Kieler Woche," and is also used as a charter vessel.

External links 
 Website of Hansesail
  German site about the Stettin

1933 ships
Ships built in Stettin
Merchant ships of Germany
Steamships of Germany
Icebreakers of Germany
World War II merchant ships of Germany
Troop ships of Germany
Merchant ships of West Germany
Steamships of West Germany
Icebreakers of West Germany
Museum ships in Germany